The eighth season of American Dad! aired on Fox from September 25, 2011, to May 13, 2012. On February 23, 2011, it was announced that the series had been renewed for an eighth production cycle.

During the season, Roger travels to the Middle East to support the troops and meets Ricky Martin, Francine gets jealous with Stan's old flame and starts a catchphrase legacy, The Smith family adopts a new puppy and buys a new hot tub, Stan is cursed to living life as an old man, and attempts to fulfill his dream of being a best man by making Principal Lewis marry the school's superintendent, Hayley and Jeff adopting a demon baby, and make a bet with Stan that he and Francine can live on minimum wage for a month. Guest stars of the season include Cee Lo Green, Gabourey Sidibe, Kristen Schaal, Sarah Natochenny, Kathy Griffin, Anjelica Huston, Elisabeth Shue, Andrea Martin, Scott Foley, Sharon Lawrence, Sarah Michelle Gellar, David Boreanaz, Michael Peña, Emily Deschanel, Hulk Hogan, Rose Byrne, and Cheech Marin.

Also, the hurricane-themed crossover episode titled "Hurricane!" with The Cleveland Show and Family Guy would have aired the previous season but was postponed due to the 2011 Super Outbreak in the Southern United States. It later aired on October 2, 2011.


Episode list

Home Media release
All eighteen episodes of the eighth season was released on DVD by 20th Century Fox in Region 2 on August 5, 2013, in Region 4 on August 21, 2013, and in Region 1 on September 24, 2013. This 3-disc box set includes all 18 episodes of Season 8, along with commentaries on select episodes, deleted scenes, and "Stan's Booty Dance."

Notes

References

External links

2011 American television seasons
2012 American television seasons